In differential geometry, the spherical image of a unit-speed curve is given by taking the curve's tangent vectors as points, all of which must lie on the unit sphere. All points of  must lie on the unit sphere because .

References

Differential geometry